Abba Sabra (fl. c. 1450) was an Ethiopian Orthodox monk, and the teacher of the children of Emperor Zara Yaqob of Ethiopia. Abba Sabra tried to convert the Beta Israel (Ethiopian Jews), but was instead converted by them to Judaism. He is best known for introducing monasticism to the Beta Israel, and the tradition of Jewish monks continued down the centuries until the Great Famine of the 1890s decimated their monasteries in Lay Armachiho.

He then later converted the son of king Zara Yaqob, Saga-Amlak, who adopted the religious name Abba Saga.

Later Abba Sabra and Abba Saga established a separate kingdom in modern day Ethiopia in which Jews were not persecuted.

References

Ethiopian clergy
Ethiopian Jews
Ethiopian former Christians
Converts to Judaism from Oriental Orthodoxy
Oriental Orthodox monks
Year of birth unknown
Year of death unknown
15th-century Ethiopian people
15th-century converts to Judaism
15th-century Christian monks